Malaysia is a megadiverse country, with huge variety of biota.

Terrestrial ecoregions
Malaysia is in the Indomalayan realm.

Tropical and subtropical moist broadleaf forests
 Borneo lowland rain forests
 Borneo montane rain forests
 Borneo peat swamp forests
 Peninsular Malaysian montane rain forests
 Peninsular Malaysian peat swamp forests
 Peninsular Malaysian rain forests
 Southwest Borneo freshwater swamp forests
 Tenasserim-South Thailand semi-evergreen rain forests

Montane grasslands and shrublands
 Kinabalu montane alpine meadows

Mangroves
 Indochina mangroves
 Myanmar coast mangroves 
 Sunda Shelf mangroves

Freshwater ecoregions
 Borneo Highlands
 Malay Peninsula Eastern Slope
 Northern Central Sumatra - Western Malaysia
 Northeastern Borneo
 Northwestern Borneo

Marine ecoregions
Malaysia spans the transition between the Central Indo-Pacific and Western Indo-Pacific marine realms.

Central Indo-Pacific
 Gulf of Thailand
 Malacca Strait
 Palawan/North Borneo
 Sunda Shelf/Java Sea

Western Indo-Pacific
 Andaman Sea Coral Coast

References

 
Malaysia
Eco